Lizy is a former commune in the Aisne department in Hauts-de-France in northern France. On 1 January 2019, it was merged into the new commune of Anizy-le-Grand.

Geography
The river Ailette forms all of the commune's southern border.

Population

See also
 Communes of the Aisne department

References

Former communes of Aisne
Aisne communes articles needing translation from French Wikipedia
Populated places disestablished in 2019